Yahoo Calendar is a Web-based calendar service from Yahoo!. It can read calendar feeds and events syndicated from sites that make use of the published Yahoo calendar programming interfaces. While users are not required to have a Yahoo Mail account, they are required to have a Yahoo ID in order to use the software. It is one of the largest online calendar providers and serves millions of users.

Features
Yahoo Calendar has the following features:

 100-year calendar
 Various alarm features which allow you to send messages to numerous sources including:
 Mobile devices 
 Yahoo Messenger
 The ability to sync your calendar with those of Palm devices and Microsoft Office Outlook, CalDAV, iPhone Calendarand some SyncML enabled [http://go.yahoo.com/next/devices_syncml cellphones
 Sharing of schedules between users. The mechanism allows several different methods of sharing including publicly sharing your calendar, sharing your calendar with a specific Yahoo Group, and sharing your calendar with a particular Yahoo! user.
 Automatically read, integrate, and republish public and personal events syndicated from Eventful, Upcoming, Evite, Bookwhen, and other sites.

Events are stored in the cloud. Calendar sharing is also available.

The New Yahoo Calendar
In October 2008 Yahoo launched Yahoo Calendar Beta to the public.

It featured a completely redesigned interface similar to the All-New Yahoo Mail. It also includes support for open standards, support for subscriptions to any iCalendar-based public calendar, Flickr integration, drag & drop functionality and Outlook auto-sync.

It was released as a stable version in November 2010.

See also
 Google Calendar
 30 Boxes
 Cozi Central
 Eventful
 Evite
 iCalendar

References

External links

Calendar
Calendaring software
SyncML
Yahoo! community websites